The 2010 Campeonato Mineiro, was the 96th season of Minas Gerais's top-flight football league.

First stage

Final phase

References

2010
Min